What's Cookin'? is a 1942 American musical film directed by Edward F. Cline and starring The Andrews Sisters, Jane Frazee, Robert Paige and Gloria Jean. The film is based on the story Wake Up and Dream written by Edgar Allan Woolf.

Plot
Mrs. Murphy's Theatrical Boarding House is a place where young performers reside. A group of those young people try to escape after finding out they are unable to pay the rent. However they get caught by the landlady and fellow tenant Marvo the Great is forced to sell his clothes to pay the rent. They next set out to the radio network WECA to visit singer Anne Payne. Anne is a former boarding house member who now works at the radio station with the Andrews Sisters and Woody Herman and His Orchestra. When Marvo is later conversing with Anne at her apartment, her wealthy neighbour Sue Courtney drops in their conversation and wonders if she can join the group.

Meanwhile, at the Courtney estate, Sue's uncle and aunt, J.P. and Agatha, meet with their advertising counselor Bob Riley. She complains that the radio station only plays classical songs. Sue offers to help them out by asking her new friends to make swing music for the radio station. They do so and Bob notices Anne, whom he immediately falls in love with. Sue meanwhile falls in love with young performer Tommy.

Cast

The Andrews Sisters as Themselves
Jane Frazee as Anne Payne
Robert Paige as Bob Riley
Gloria Jean as Sue Courtney
Leo Carrillo as Marvo the Great
Billie Burke as Agatha Courtney
Charles Butterworth as J.P. Courtney
Grace McDonald as Angela
Donald O'Connor as Tommy
Peggy Ryan as Peggy
Franklin Pangborn as Professor Bistell
Susan Levine as Tag-a-long
The Jivin' Jacks and Jills as Themselves
Woody Herman as himself
Charles Lane as K.D. Reynolds
Ray Walker as Happy

Production
The film was known as Wake Up and Dream.

Soundtrack
Golden Wedding
Written by Gabriel Marie
Special arrangement by Woody Herman
Played by Woody Herman and His Orchestra
Woodchopper's Ball
Written by Joe Bishop
Played by Woody Herman and His Orchestra
I'll Pray for You
Written by Arthur Altman and Kim Gannon
Played by Woody Herman and His Orchestra
Sung by Jane Frazee, Gloria Jean, and The Andrews Sisters
What to Do?
Written by Sid Robin
Played by Woody Herman and His Orchestra
Sung by The Andrews Sisters
You Can't Hold a Memory in Your Arms
Written by Hy Zaret and Arthur Altman
Played by Woody Herman and His Orchestra
Sung by Jane Frazee
Blue Flame
Written by James Noble
Played by Woody Herman and His Orchestra
Lo, Hear the Gentle Lark
Sung by Gloria Jean
If
Played by the studio orchestra
Sung by the studio vocal group
Love Laughs at Anything
Written by Gene de Paul, and Don Raye
Sung by Gloria Jean
Pack Up Your Troubles in Your Old Kit Bag and Smile, Smile, Smile!
Music by Felix Powell
Lyrics by George Asaf
Played by Woody Herman and His Orchestra
Sung by Jane Frazee, Gloria Jean, and The Andrews Sisters
Amen Spitural
Written by Vic Schoen, and Roger Segure
Played by Woody Herman and His Orchestra
Sung by Jane Frazee, Gloria Jean, and The Andrews Sisters

Reception
The New York Times noticed there is "plenty cookin' in this brisk, breezy Andrews Sisters vehicle". It also called the supporting cast "topheavy". The website Answers.com gave the film one star.

References

External links 
 
 

1942 films
American black-and-white films
1942 musical films
Universal Pictures films
Films directed by Edward F. Cline
American musical films
Films with screenplays by Edgar Allan Woolf
1940s English-language films
1940s American films